Anna Eames (born October 1, 1990 in Robbinsdale, Minnesota) is an American swimmer. She competed at the 2012 Summer Paralympics and the 2008 Summer Paralympics.

References

1990 births
Living people
American female butterfly swimmers
Paralympic swimmers of the United States
Swimmers at the 2012 Summer Paralympics
Swimmers at the 2008 Summer Paralympics
Paralympic bronze medalists for the United States
Paralympic silver medalists for the United States
Paralympic gold medalists for the United States
American disabled sportspeople
People from Robbinsdale, Minnesota
Medalists at the 2008 Summer Paralympics
Medalists at the 2012 Summer Paralympics
S10-classified Paralympic swimmers
Medalists at the World Para Swimming Championships
Paralympic medalists in swimming
21st-century American women
American female freestyle swimmers